Tianjin–Jizhou railway or Jinji railway is a 92 km long minor railway line in China connecting urban Tianjin and Jizhou. In 2015, a number of regional rail services referred as Line S9 started operating on the line.

Stations for passenger services

 Stations don't provide passenger services, but freight transports: Nancang, 129 Gongli, Beicang, Hangouzhen, Xinzhuang, Yangxinzhuang

See also 
 Transport in Tianjin

Notes and references

External links 

Railway lines in China
Rail transport in Tianjin